Anna Sparks ( Sanders; born September 25, 1981) is an American former professional racing cyclist, who rode professionally for  in 2016 and 2017. In 2015, Sparks finished ninth at the San Dimas Stage Race.

See also
 List of 2016 UCI Women's Teams and riders

References

External links
 
 
 
 

1981 births
Living people
American female cyclists
Place of birth missing (living people)
21st-century American women